Events from the year 1535 in India.

Events
 Siege of Chittorgarh Fort
 Bahadur Shah of Gujarat first reign as sultan of Gujarat Sultanate ends (began 1526)

Births
 19 January Mata Bhani, also known as Bibi Bhani, daughter of third Sikh guru Guru Amar Das, wife of fourth Sikh guru Guru Ram Das and mother of fifth Sikh guru Guru Arjan Dev is born (dies 1598)

Deaths

See also

 Timeline of Indian history